Certain Honorable Men is a 1968 American TV movie starring Van Heflin and Peter Fonda. It was written by Rod Serling.

It was part of a series of specials called On Stage sponsored by Prudential.

Cast
Van Heflin
Peter Fonda

Production
It was inspired by the Thomas J. Dodd case.

Fonda had to cut his hair to play his role. "I felt like a fag in drag trying to play Angela Lansbury", he said.

It was filmed at NBC's studios in Brooklyn.

Reception
The New York Times said it was "fair more interesting than the average TV drama".

References

External links

1968 films
1968 television films
American television films